Diwân is a studio album released in 1998 by Franco-Algerian raï artist Rachid Taha. In contrast to his earlier releases, Diwân contains less rock and punk music, and features more traditional Arabic instruments. Many of the songs are about the founding fathers of raï music, and the lyrics are in Arabic and French.

A video clip was made for "Ida".

Track listing

Charts

Personnel
 Rachid Taha - vocals
 Amina Alaoui - vocals 
 Steve Hillage - engineer, guitar, mixing, producer, programming 
Kaseeme Jalanne - oud 
 Nabil Khalidi - banjo, oud, percussion, backing vocals
 Bob Loveday - strings 
Pete Macgowan - strings 
Hossam Ramzy - percussion 
 Geoffrey Richardson - strings 
 Aziz Ben Salem - flute
Source:

References

External links
Official website

1998 albums
Albums produced by Steve Hillage
Rachid Taha albums
Barclay (record label) albums